La Opinión de Málaga is a newspaper published in Málaga, Spain. It is edited by Prensa Ibérica.

Prensa Ibérica's project to create a newspaper for Málaga and its surroundings was announced in 1998, whilst the first issue was published on 25 May 1999 with an with an initial circulation of 40,000. Having its main headquarters in Málaga, the newspaper also had a printing plant in Antequera. The newspaper became a competitor of Diario Sur.

References

Bibliography 
 
 

Publications established in 1999
Daily newspapers published in Spain
Mass media in Andalusia
Spanish-language newspapers